The James A. Burden House is a former residence located at 7 East 91st Street in the Carnegie Hill area of Manhattan in New York City. The lower school of the Convent of the Sacred Heart is currently located there.

History 
In 1901, William D. Sloane, of the W. & J. Sloane furniture family, purchased this property from Andrew Carnegie. Soon after, he commissioned the architects Warren & Wetmore to design a house as a wedding present for his daughter Adele, who married James A. Burden Jr., heir to the Burden Iron Works.

Completed in 1905, the mansion is an Italian Renaissance-style townhouse, embellished by French-inspired detailing around the windows and balcony. In 1907, the New York Times wrote: "so perfectly is the French idea carried out at the Burden residence ... the only way one can enter is through a courtyard ... [the central stairway has] a tread so low and wide that one ascends ... without being conscious of any effort."

In 1938, the contents of the house were auctioned by Parke-Bernet. The Convent of the Sacred Heart purchased the mansion in 1940. It now serves as the location of the Convent of the Sacred Heart's lower school. It is also available for functions outside school hours.

A Designated Landmark of New York plaque was installed by the New York Landmarks Preservation Foundation in 1989.

See also 
 List of New York City Designated Landmarks in Manhattan from 59th to 110th Streets
 National Register of Historic Places listings in Manhattan from 59th to 110th Streets

Further reading

References

External links 

Homepage of the James A. Burden House

Houses in Manhattan
New York City Designated Landmarks in Manhattan
Upper East Side
Houses completed in 1905
Warren and Wetmore buildings
1905 establishments in New York City
Gilded Age mansions